The Israeli football league system is a series of interconnected leagues for club football in Israel. The system has a hierarchical format with promotion and relegation between leagues at different levels, and allows even the smallest club to dream of rising to the very top of the system. There are five levels, containing a total of 16 divisions. It is run by the Israel Football Association (IFA).

Structure
The top division of Israeli football is the Premier League. Liga Leumit is the second tier. These two divisions all operate at the national level.

Below Liga Leumit the divisions are split into regionalised leagues. Liga Alef is the third tier, and is split into north and south divisions. Liga Bet, the fourth tier, is divided into four regionalised leagues. Liga Gimel, the bottom division of Israeli football, is split into eight regionalised leagues.

League structure history
League football in Mandatory Palestine began in 1931, and second and third tiers were added to the league as early as 1937. However, football was then disrupted by the Arab revolt and then World War II. In 1947, league football resumed with two tiers, the top Palestine League and the second tier Liga Bet.

Following the Israeli Declaration of Independence and War of Independence, football league action resumed in 1949, with a two-tier league, the second served as a temporary second division, titled Liga Meuhedet (lit. 'Special League'). The following season, league football was cancelled due to disagreements between the Maccabi and Hapoel factions in the IFA. With the return of league football the following season, a third tier was added, and the leagues were assigned as Liga Alef (lit. 'League A'), Liga Bet ('League B') and Liga Gimel ('League C').

In 1955–56, Liga Leumit (lit. 'National League') was created as the new top division, demoting the Alef, Bet and Gimel leagues to the second, third and fourth tiers respectively, with a fifth tier, Liga Dalet (lit. 'Liga D') added for one season in 1958–59, before returning in 1969–70.

In 1976–77, Liga Artzit (lit. 'State League') was created as the new second tier, demoting the Alef, Bet, Gimel and Dalet leagues to the third, fourth, fifth and sixth tiers. Liga Dalet was scrapped at the end of the 1984–85 season, bringing back the league system to five tiers.

In 1999–2000 the Israeli Premier League was added at the top of the league system, demoting the other leagues to second to sixth tiers. At the end of the 2008–09 season, Liga Artzit was scrapped, bringing the league system back to five tiers, and its current structure

League system changes

Leagues

Premier League

The Israeli Premier League (Ligat HaAl, lit. Super League) is the highest league in Israeli football and has 14 member clubs. Winning the Premier League is the top prize in Israeli football and guarantees a berth in the UEFA Europa League.

The league was created in 1999 as the IFA aimed to realign the leagues to improve competition. Two teams are relegated to Liga Leumit at the end of each season, with two clubs promoted in return.

Current Premier League clubs (2022–23)

Beitar Jerusalem
Bnei Sakhnin
F.C. Ashdod
Hapoel Be'er Sheva
Hapoel Hadera
Hapoel Haifa
Hapoel Jerusalem
Hapoel Tel Aviv
Ironi Kiryat Shmona
Maccabi Bnei Reineh 
Maccabi Haifa
Maccabi Netanya 
Maccabi Tel Aviv
Sektzia Ness Ziona

Liga Leumit

Liga Leumit (lit. National League) is the second tier of Israeli football, a position it has held since 1999, having originally been the top division prior to the Premier League's creation. It has 16 member clubs, the team finished first are promoted to the Premier League, The bottom two or three teams are relegated to Liga Alef at the end of each season.

Current Liga Leumit clubs (2022–23)

Bnei Yehuda Tel Aviv
F.C. Kafr Qasim
Hapoel Acre
Hapoel Afula
Hapoel Ashdod
Hapoel Kfar Saba
Hapoel Nof HaGalil
Hapoel Petah Tikva
Hapoel Ramat Gan
Hapoel Ramat HaSharon
Hapoel Rishon LeZion
Hapoel Umm al-Fahm
Ironi Tiberias
Maccabi Ahi Nazareth
Maccabi Jaffa
Maccabi Petah Tikva

Liga Alef

Liga Alef (lit. A League) is the third tier of Israeli football, a position it has held since 2009. Between 1999 and 2009 it was the fourth tier after Liga Artzit, between 1976 and 1999 it was the third tier after Liga Artzit, between 1955 and 1976 it was the second division, and between 1951 and 1955 it was the first division. Liga Alef consists of two divisions and has 32 member clubs. The divisions are based on the clubs' geographical position in the country and are split into a north and south category. The top club from each division is promoted at the end of the season to Liga Leumit, the bottom two clubs (from each division) are relegated at the end of the season to Liga Bet.

Liga Bet

Liga Bet (lit. B League) is the fourth tier of Israeli football, a position it has held since 2009. Between 1999 and 2009 it was the fifth tier after Liga Alef, Between 1976 and 1999 it was the fourth tier after the creation of Liga Artzit, between 1955 and 1976 it was the third division, and between 1951 and 1955 it was the second division. Liga Bet consists of four divisions and has 64 member clubs. The divisions are based on the clubs' geographical position in the country and are split into two north categories and two south categories. The top club from each division is promoted at the end of the season to the Liga Alef and the bottom two clubs (from each division) are relegated at the end of the season to Liga Gimel.

Liga Gimel

Liga Gimel (lit. C League) is the fifth and bottom tier of Israeli football, a position it has held since 2009. Between 1999 and 2009 it was the sixth tier after Liga Bet, Between 1976 and 1999 it was the fifth tier after the creation of Liga Artzit, between 1955 and 1976 it was the fourth division, and between 1951 and 1955 it was the third division. Liga Gimel consists of eight divisions of varying size. At the start of the 2014–15 season there are a total of 111 member clubs. If they meet criteria laid down by the IFA, the top club from each division is promoted at the end of the season to the Liga Bet. As it is the lowest division, no clubs are relegated.

Football clubs in Israel
For a full list of clubs see List of football clubs in Israel.

Other football league systems in Israel

Women's League

Ligat Nashim was established in 1999. Until 2010, the league system was played with only the top division (except for 2006–07), sometimes divided regionally. Since 2010, the league has two tiers, both national. Depending on number of registrations, the second division may be divided regionally, but this hadn't happen yet.

At women's youth levels (under 19 and under 17), there is only a top division, divided regionally at both age brackets, with the champion decided using a play-off match.

Noar League

Since 2011, the league had been organized in four tiers. At the top, a national division called Noar Premier League, two regional divisions at tiers 2 and 3 (Noar Leumit League and Noar Artzit League, respectively) and a changing number of regional divisions at the 4th tier, depending on registrations.

References

 
Football league systems in Europe